Mary Page may refer to:

Mary Boomer Page (died 1927), American educator 
Mary L. Page (1849–1921), American architect
Mary Maud Page (1867–1925), English-South African botanical illustrator
Mary Hutcheson Page, American suffragist

See also
The Strange Case of Mary Page, a 1916 American lost film